The Spooktacular New Adventures of Casper is an American animated television spin-off series and a sequel of the feature film Casper, which, in turn, was based on the Harvey Comics cartoon character of Casper the Friendly Ghost.

Production 
At the time that principal filming wrapped on Casper, a sequel was proposed and a treatment was written, but a combination of less-than-stellar box office gross (although the film grossed $100 million in the US, the budget was more than half of that total and analysts predicted much higher earnings for the film) and the fact that both Christina Ricci and Bill Pullman were attached to other projects after Casper and would not be available until more than a year later caused the idea to be scrapped. The producers then decided to abandon the live-action sequel ideas and instead develop a cartoon series to continue the story.

The show aired on Fox Kids television from 1996–1998 for 3 seasons. 52 episodes were produced, but only the first 46 appeared on Fox, with the remaining debuting on Fox Family Channel. Many of the same people who worked on this show also worked on Tiny Toon Adventures, Animaniacs and Pinky and the Brain (the latter of which was a spin-off from the former; coincidentally, the former had also debuted on Fox).

The new Casper broke from earlier versions, following a sitcom-style pattern of one-liners and pop culture gags in a manner similar to the Casper feature. The show would also frequently break the fourth wall. The show used old Casper supporting characters such as Casper's cousin Spooky, Spooky's "ghoulfriend" Pearl (or "Poil" as rendered by Spooky's Brooklyn accent), and Nightmare the Ghost Horse who, unlike in the original cartoons and comics, does not talk. The show also introduced new characters, including Casper's super-loud teacher Ms. Banshee.

Characters 
 Casper McFadden has been haunting his family home of Whipstaff Manor for some time, having died from pneumonia (according to a newspaper seen during the scene in the attic from the feature film) after he played out in the cold for too long when he was 12 years old. Now in the care of his three trouble-making uncles, Stretch, Stinkie and Fatso, Casper's afterlife is not exactly pleasant. He has to put up with his uncles' outrageous antics, and his wish to gain a friend in a human is usually ruined. The only exception to this was when Kat and Dr. Harvey moved into Whipstaff. Kat became a close friend to him. Casper has been a ghost for just over a hundred years, as Stinkie and Fatso once stated that Casper's age is 115 and a half years old. Casper himself is very friendly and outgoing, but he sometimes appears rather shy. Most ghosts view his behavior as unusual, as they believe ghosts should not be friendly or polite in any way. Other ghosts are sometimes even afraid of his good manners, to which Casper sometimes uses to his advantage. One example was when the Ghostly Trio appealed to Casper for help after being convicted in a supernatural court, which denied them to be ghosts any longer as they had no unfinished business on Earth, therefore they would have to crossover. Casper intervened, and revealed quite honestly that his uncles had not taught him how to be scary yet, enabling them to remain as ghosts on Earth. As in the film, Casper is voiced by Malachi Pearson.

 The Ghostly Trio are Casper's uncles, who love scaring humans, or as they call them, "fleshies", "skinbags", "bone-bags" and "skinsacks". They include Stretch, the tallest, and hot-headed leader, Stinkie, who almost always smells, and in turn loves anything smelly. He uses his bad smell as a weapon or annoyance on others, and Fatso, who is seen as the least intelligent of the brothers, and loves to eat almost anything. The three are chaotic in every sense, and can't resist scaring or causing trouble no matter what the cost. They order Casper around constantly, who they refer to as "Bulbhead" or "Short-sheet". However, despite being considered mean spirits, they do on a number of occasions display compassionate sides. One example was when Casper was accidentally turned into a baby. The Ghostly Trio at first reluctantly, took care of him, but soon bonded with him, particularly Stretch. They also appeared to be worried about Casper when they thought he was going to face "the most evil spirit to haunt the Earth", Whitebeard, on his own. There was a rare occasion when Casper became furious and shouted at the Trio for not restraining their own anger during a "frightening storm", which fed off the fury of others. Casper even planned on leaving his uncles, which surprised them further. However, using the best thing to compliments only the Trio could give, such as "fun to knock around", "easily insultable", and even admitting that they liked him, they persuaded him to stay. In the film, the primary turning point for the Ghostly Trio was when they kept their promise to Dr. Harvey, and brought his wife Amelia, to speak to him one last time. As in the feature film, they are voiced by Joe Nipote, Joe Alaskey and Brad Garrett. Starting with Season 3, however, the role of Fatso was taken over by Jess Harnell.

 Dr. James Harvey (or "Doc" as he is called by the Ghostly Trio) is a psychiatrist and is shown to be an alumnus of Johns Hopkins University. In the film, after his wife Amelia's death, he has gone on to become a "ghost therapist” to find and make contact with his wife, because he believes she is a ghost. However, after learning that she instead became an angel, he and his teenage daughter Kat stay at their new home of Whipstaff, where he continues to work as a ghost therapist, trying (unsuccessfully) to rehabilitate the mischief-making Ghostly Trio. Dr. Harvey is an easy-going guy with a big heart. He obviously loves Kat, although he sometimes appears rather neglectful of his motherless daughter's emotional needs. This was demonstrated in the scene from the film where he speaks with his departed wife when he says he is worried that he's not taking good care of her, but Amelia assured him that he was doing a good job, although she gave him some "motherly" advice ("Don't pick up the extension every time she gets a phone call, french fries are not a breakfast food..." etc.) Dr. Harvey tolerates the Ghostly Trio antics, and it is because of this that they grow to like him, and kept their promise to him so he could speak to Amelia. The animated version of Dr. Harvey deviates slightly from the film version, in that the animated Dr. Harvey was totally focused on being a therapist and used psychological epithets when talking to everyone, including his own daughter. Kat, Casper and the Ghostly trio simply regarded this as an eccentricity. The role was originated by Bill Pullman in the Casper film, but he is voiced by Dan Castellaneta on the show.

Kathleen "Kat" Harvey is the daughter of Dr. Harvey and is portrayed as the stereotypical teenager who has a sense of humor. She is about 13 years old (about the age Christina Ricci, who originated the role in the Casper film, was when the film was filmed) and is a good companion to Casper. Kat hates having to put up with the Ghostly Trio because none of them get along with her. Any time they spend together usually involves insulting each other. On one occasion, after the Trio made fun of her for not being able to get a job, Kat made a bet with them saying she could get a job, and bring home a paycheck before they could. The end result was all of them getting a job in the same theatre, which became partly destroyed, after which they declared a draw. But there are rare occasions when Kat and the Ghostly Trio would work together. One example was when to Kat and Casper's surprise, the Trio were trying to return the goldfish Kat won at a fair back to its mother. At first she thought they were going to turn it into a "ghost fish", but when they told her what they were planning, she became slightly emotional and decided to help. Another example was when Dr. Harvey was given his own television show in order to help all ghosts. Both he and Casper became famous and power hungry, resulting in Kat and the Ghostly Trio being neglected, and treated badly. This resulted in them working together to remind Dr. Harvey what was more important. Kat is voiced by Kath Soucie on the show.

 Spooky is Casper's mischief-minded cousin. He looks up to the Ghostly Trio as his heroes and, while having no true dislike for Casper, despises his cousin's lack of interest in scaring humans. As such, Spooky is always trying to out-scare Casper and become the best in class, but usually fails. However, underneath the gruff, ghostly exterior, Spooky may also have a slight soft spot for his cousin. Spooky is visually very similar to Casper, but he has a black nose and freckles, wears a brown "doiby" hat, and speaks in a Brooklyn accent. He is voiced by Rob Paulsen.

 Pearl or "Poil" is Spooky's "ghoulfriend". Often absent-minded, Pearl is almost always oblivious to current situations and takes things way too literally. She adores Spooky and everything about him, right down to the freckles on his face and his black nose, is good friends with Casper and doesn't care as much for the Ghostly Trio as Spooky does. She is voiced by Miriam Flynn.

 Miss Maddie Banshee is the teacher at Casper, Spooky and Poil's ghost school. Befitting her name, Miss Banshee can yell and scream loud enough to be heard several towns away, even to wake the dead. Miss Banshee enjoys being a teacher, but dreams of being a professional opera singer. All three of the Ghostly Trio have a crush on Miss Banshee, and constantly compete for her affections. Miss Banshee is okay with the Trio, but remains unimpressed with their efforts. She is voiced by Tress MacNeille.

 Amber Whitmire and the Jennifers are classmates and rivals of Kat's at Friendship Junior High School. Amber and the Jennifers are portrayed as rich, mean, and spoiled queen bees. Jennifer #1 has dark brown hair and wears glasses and is the closest to Amber, Jennifer #2 has strawberry blonde hair, and Jennifer #3 has light brown hair and a snorting laugh and is the least intelligent of the three as she has been held back two times in junior high. Amber is voiced by Sherry Lynn and the Jennifers are voiced by Debi Derryberry.

Episodes

Series overview

Season 1 (1996)

Season 2 (1996–97)

Season 3 (1997–98)

Season 4 (1998)

Voice cast 
 Malachi Pearson
 Kath Soucie
 Joe Nipote
 Rob Paulsen
 Brad Garrett
 Tress MacNeille
 Jim Cummings
 Miriam Flynn
 Joe Alaskey
 Dan Castellaneta

Additional voices 

 Susan Tolsky
 Benny Grant
 Pat Fraley
 Jeff Bennett
 Jess Harnell
 Charlie Adler
 Zelda Rubenstein
 Jack Angel
 Debi Derryberry
 Nancy Cartwright
 Joe Lala
 Michael Finnegan
 Ben Stein
 Sherry Lynn
 Jonathan Harris
 David Coburn
 Frank Welker
 E. G. Daily
 Christine Cavanaugh
 Tony Jay
 B. J. Ward
 Gail Matthius
 Heidi Shannon
 Edward Hibbert
 Jodi Carlisle
 Gregg Berger
 Steve Mackall
 John Astin
 Sherri Stoner
 Ginny McSwain
 Paul Williams
 Dorian Harewood
 Kevin Michael Richardson
 Edie McClurg
 Dana Hill
 Fred Willard
 April Winchell
 Danny Mann
 S. Scott Bullock
 Mark Hamill
 Nora Dunn
 Hinton Battle
 Robin Leach
 Maggie Roswell

Crew 
 Ginny McSwain - Casting Director and Voice Director (seasons 1–2)
 Kelly Ward - Voice Director (seasons 3–4)

Home media 
From 1996 through 1998, Universal Studios Home Video released episodes from seasons 1, 2, and 3 onto VHS.

In 2007/2008, Universal Studios Home Entertainment released two volume collections entitled The Spooktacular New Adventures of Casper, Volume 1 and The Spooktacular New Adventures of Casper, Volume 2 on DVD in Region 1.  Volume 1 consists of the first 5 episodes of the animated series, while volume 2 contains the last 5 episodes of season 1.

No further plans have been made by Universal to release any further DVDs of the show.

VHS

United States

DVD

References

External links 
 
 

1996 American television series debuts
1998 American television series endings
1990s American animated television series
American animated television spin-offs
American children's animated adventure television series
American children's animated comedy television series
American children's animated fantasy television series
American children's animated horror television series
American sequel television series
Animated television shows based on films
Casper the Friendly Ghost
English-language television shows
Fox Kids
Fox Broadcasting Company original programming
Television shows based on Harvey Comics
Animated television series about children
Animated television series about ghosts
Television series by Amblin Entertainment
Television series by Universal Animation Studios
Television shows set in Maine
YTV (Canadian TV channel) original programming